Minuscule 68 (in the Gregory-Aland numbering), ε 269 (von Soden), is a Greek minuscule manuscript of the New Testament, on parchment leaves. Palaeographically it has been assigned to the 11th century. The manuscript has complex contents. It was adapted for liturgical use, it has marginalia.

Description 

The codex contains complete text of the four Gospels on 291 leaves (size ). The text is written in one column per page, 23 lines per page.

There is also another division according to the smaller Ammonian Sections (no references to the Eusebian Canons).

It has musical notes in red.

Text 

The Greek text of the codex is a representative of the Byzantine text-type. Aland placed it in Category V.

According to the Claremont Profile Method it represents textual family Πb in Luke 1 and Luke 20. In Luke 10 no profile was made.

History 

The manuscript was brought to England from Zante by Sir George Wheler, botanist and early traveller, in 1676 with two other copies (95 and ℓ 3). It was used by John Mill in his Novum Testamentum graecum (as Wheeler 1). C. R. Gregory saw it in 1883.

It is currently housed in Lincoln College Library (Gr. 17), Oxford.

See also 

 List of New Testament minuscules
 Biblical manuscript
 Textual criticism

References

Further reading 

 

Greek New Testament minuscules
11th-century biblical manuscripts